Abe W. Turner (April 26, 1893 – May 25, 1947) was a justice of the Utah Supreme Court from 1944 to 1946.

Born in Heber City, Utah, Turner attended the University of Utah and received a degree from Georgetown University in 1916, gaining admission to the Utah State Bar on October 9, 1916. He was in private practice until 1931, when he became City Attorney of Provo. In 1932, he was elected to a seat on the Fourth Judicial District, thereafter winning reelection in 1936 and 1940.

On March 14, 1944, Governor J. Bracken Lee named Turner a justice pro tempore of the Supreme Court of Utah, where Turner remained until February 18, 1946.

After leaving the court, Turner resumed private practice in Provo, Utah, until his death at the age of 54.

References

1893 births
1947 deaths
University of Utah alumni
Georgetown University alumni
Justices of the Utah Supreme Court